José Fernandes André Cavaco Miglietti (11 August 1943 – 24 December 2006), known as Zeca, was a Mozambican footballer who played mainly as a defender, either in the center or in the left.

Over the course of 8 seasons, Zeca amassed Primeira Liga totals of 140 games, mainly at Benfica.

Club career
Born in Lourenço Marques, Portuguese Mozambique, Zeca came to Portugal influenced by the success of Eusébio, also from Mozambique. He started in reserves for two seasons, until he made its debut on 23 March 1969, with Otto Glória.

In the first two seasons, he is overshadowed by the breakthrough of Humberto Coelho, and also by other  more established players, like Jacinto Santos and Humberto Fernandes, leaving him to play in the left-back role. In 1970–71, Zeca played alongside Humberto Coelho in the center of the defence, in a league and cup double in his best individual season. After suffering a debilitating injury, he was loaned by to Atlético CP in 1972, followed by a second loan to Clube Oriental de Lisboa. He signed a permanent deal with U.F.C.I. Tomar in 1974.

He retired shortly in 1985 and managed a number of smaller teams in Azores. He died from respiratory problems on 24 December 2006.

Personal life
He is the older brother of Abel, who played for Benfica and Porto.

Honours
Benfica
Portuguese League: 1968–69, 1970–71, 1971–72
Portuguese Cup: 1968–69, 1970–71, 1971–72

References

External links
 
 

1943 births
2006 deaths
Sportspeople from Maputo
Colonial people in Mozambique
Mozambican emigrants to Portugal
Mozambican footballers
Portuguese footballers
Association football defenders
Primeira Liga players
Liga Portugal 2 players
S.L. Benfica footballers
Atlético Clube de Portugal players
Clube Oriental de Lisboa players
U.F.C.I. Tomar players